Baronnites is an ammonoid cephalopod from the upper Valanginian stage of the Lower Cretaceous. Baronnites is represented by a single species, Baronnites hirsutus found in marine silty to sandy limestone and marl in Morocco, associated with another ammonoid, Busnardoites campylotoxus, brachiopods, bivalves, and other invertebrates.

References

Cretaceous ammonites
Fossils of Morocco